Evansville is an unincorporated community in Berks County, Pennsylvania, United States. It is located along the shores of Ontelaunee Lake in Maidencreek Township, and is served by the Fleetwood Area School District.

External links

Unincorporated communities in Berks County, Pennsylvania
Unincorporated communities in Pennsylvania